David Richard Langevin (born May 15, 1954) is an American former professional ice hockey defenseman who played 216 games for the Edmonton Oilers in the World Hockey Association (WHA) as well as 513 games in the National Hockey League (NHL) for the New York Islanders, Minnesota North Stars and Los Angeles Kings between 1977 and 1987. He is a member of the United States Hockey Hall of Fame.

Amateur career
Langevin played for the University of Minnesota Duluth ice hockey team in 1972–76. He was also a member of the US national team at the 1976 Ice Hockey World Championship tournament in Katowice.

Professional career
Drafted 112th overall by the NY Islanders in the 1974 NHL Entry Draft, Langevin instead chose to sign with the Edmonton Oilers of the rival World Hockey Association, who also had selected him in the WHA draft the same year, since his prospects of getting regular playing time were better in the WHA. Langevin became a solid performer for the Oilers, making the All-WHA Second All Star team in 1978–79. When the Oilers joined the NHL the following season, the Islanders reclaimed him as a former New York draft pick.

Langevin started his National Hockey League career with the New York Islanders, winning four consecutive Stanley Cups. He also played with the Minnesota North Stars and Los Angeles Kings. His NHL career lasted from 1979 to 1987. Langevin played in the 1983 NHL All-Star Game and he was a member of the United States team at the 1981 Canada Cup.

Langevin was a strictly defensive defensemen, whose forte was full-body checking. Langevin was instrumental in the Islanders come-back victory in the 1985 playoffs against the Washington Capitals. Benched for the first two losses, he entered game three with a decisive physical presence, most notably checking sniper Mike Gartner with a powerful hip check. The Islanders went on to win three straight and became the only team ever to lose the first two games of a five-game series and go on to win.

Post Playing Career
Langevin served as head coach of the expansion Idaho Steelheads of the West Coast Hockey League (WCHL) during the 1997–98 season. After a single season in Idaho he returned to Minnesota and became a real estate appraiser and high school hockey coach. He also served as a South Suburban (MnJHL) head coach until the team folded following the 2001–02 season. He has also done part-time work for the NHL Central Scouting Bureau after his retirement.

Langevin, who wore #26 for the Islanders, was inducted into the United States Hockey Hall of Fame in 1993.

Awards and honors

WHA Second All-Star Team (1979)
Played in NHL All-Star Game (1983)
Stanley Cup Champions (1980, 1981, 1982, 1983)

Career statistics

Regular season and playoffs

International

References

External links

Dave Langevin's profile at Hockeydraftcentral.com

1954 births
Living people
American men's ice hockey defensemen
Edmonton Oilers (WHA) draft picks
Edmonton Oilers (WHA) players
Ice hockey people from Saint Paul, Minnesota
Los Angeles Kings players
Minnesota North Stars players
National Hockey League All-Stars
New Haven Nighthawks players
New York Islanders draft picks
New York Islanders players
Stanley Cup champions
United States Hockey Hall of Fame inductees